Hold Me Now is a studio album by Australian-born Irish singer and composer Johnny Logan. The song includes his 1987 Eurovision Song Contest winning song Hold Me Now and a new version of his 1980 Eurovision winning song What's Another Year?.

Track listing
LP/Cassette

Charts

References

Johnny Logan (singer) albums
1987 albums